Senator Nguyen may refer to:

Janet Nguyen (born 1976), California State Senate
Joe Nguyen (born 1983), Washington State Senate